The Chile International is an open international badminton tournament in Chile. The tournament has been an International Series level. In 2014, the tournament used a new experimental scoring system, best of five games to 11 without setting. In 2015, the Federación Deportiva Nacional de Badminton de Chile held two level 4 BWF events, International Challenge and International Series.

Previous Winners

Performances by nation

References 

Badminton tournaments
Sports competitions in Chile
Recurring sporting events established in 1999
1999 establishments in Chile